Gandikota is a village and historical fort on the right bank of the Penna river, 15 km from Jammalamadugu in Kadapa district, Andhra Pradesh, India. The fort was the centre of power for various dynasties, such as the Kalyani Chalukyas, Pemmasani Nayakas, and the Golconda Sultanate. Gandikota was the capital of Pemmasani Nayakas for more than 300 years. Pemmasani Ramalinga Nayudu constructed the huge fort at Gandikota with 101 towers replacing the previous sand fort constructed by Kaka Raja, Vassals of Kalyani Chalukya rulers. Various additions of Islamic architecture were made during subsequent Muslim rule.

Etymology

The fort of Gandikota acquired its name due to the 'gorge', formed between the Erramala range of hills, also known as Gandikota hills and the river Penna (Pennar) that flows at its foot, reducing its width to a mere 100 m (look for the river image in the montage/main image).

Geology
Gandikota canyon consists of sedimentary rocks, namely 'Gandikota Quartzite' in the Chitravati Group part of Cuddapah Supergroup.
The Chitravati Group consists of three formation
rank units: the Pulivendla Quartzite; the Tadpatri
Formation; and the Gandikota Quartzite.

History

Early history
Gandikota is a village on the right bank of the river Penna, 15 km from Jammalamudugu in Kadapa district, Andhra Pradesh, India. Gandikota area was first identified and made Sand fort in 1123 by Kakatiya Raja of nearby Bommanapalle village and a subordinate of Ahavamalla Someswara I, Kalyani Chalukya ruler. Gandikota came under the rule of Kakatiya dynasty from 1239 A.D to 1304 A.D and ruled by their various subordinates.

The village transformed into major fort after the emergence of Pemmasani Nayakas.

Recently, Tavva Obul Reddy, a Mydukur-based historian, discovered a copper plate inscription on the history of Gandikonda Fort. The inscription dates back to 16th century.

Vemana poet, native of Kadapa district and believed to have lived in Gandikota area for a short period.
Jean Baptiste Tavernier visited the fort during his travel to Golconda sultanate.

Efforts are being put forth to give Gandikota a world heritage status.

Major structures 

In the fort are two ancient temples, dedicated to Madhava and Ranganatha. They are in ruins and the fort area is full of the debris of ages and many ancient structures in varying stages of decay. The large granary, with a vaulted roof, is now used as watchman's quarters. The Jamia Masjid has two adjacent minarets. A heritage festival is held every year in the fort area.

The other structures in the fort, include another large granary (used for storing food and grains late back), a magazine, a graceful 'pigeon tower' with fretted windows and an extensive palace built by bricks with some plastered decorations and some wells. There is an old cannon lying in the fort. There is the 'Rayalacheruvu' with its perennial springs irrigating some lime and plantain gardens. It is said that this 'Cheruvu' was connected to a fountain in Jamia Masjid by pipes, traces of which can still be seen.

There were other gardens and springs. There is an undated inscription on a boulder, near the 'Nagajhari' outside the fort, recording the gift of two gardens at the place to the temple. There was a garden called 'Parebagh' with a waterfall at the foot of the hills, on the bank of the Penneru.

There are multiple camping areas outside the Fort and on the banks of the Penna (Pennar) river.

The other main attractions at the fort includes House of the Drum (drums were used to alert the army in case of invasion), Charminar, Jail (where in the prisoners were held captive) and  Red Koneru (Also known as pond of Swords, The huge lake in front of the mosque, where the warriors used to dip their swords in this lake and the waters used to turn blood red after the war).

Access and transportation 

The nearest railway stations are Muddanuru which is  26 km  (railway code: MOO) and Jammalamadugu (JMDG) in Kadapa District. There are number of trains from Gooty Junction. Recently the town of Jammalamadugu which is closest to Gandikota fort  also got railway connectivity due to the completion of Nandyal–Yerraguntla section railway line. However frequency of trains on this line is very low.

There are buses available from Jammalamadugu Old Bus Stand (Gandhi Statue Junction) to Gandikota.

Inside the fort there is no means of transportation except to walk by foot. It is ideal to engage a guide as the fort area is huge. There is a good downhill trek through the canyon that leads to the riverbed. There is a dam upstream (Gandikota Dam) and a dam downstream (Mylavaram Dam).

There is a Haritha hotel run by Andhra Pradesh Tourism department which has lodging facilities. However the facilities are limited during the weekdays as the visitors during weekdays are low

Developments 
In November 2015, Andhra Pradesh government cited a plan to develop Gandikota as next major tourist hub of Andhra Pradesh.

References

Further reading
Article about this visiting Gandikota: Grand Canyon at Gandikota, Deccan Chronicle newspaper (Hyderabad edition), 6 April 2012, Wanderlust Page: 21

External links

GandiKota Travel Guide to Plan Your Trip by Nature inFocus/
 Imperial Gazetteer of India: About Gandikota
 Water color paintings by Thomas Fraser and Sir Thomas Anburey-- in 1799 & 1802
 French Traveller Tavernier's experience about Gandikota Fort & about Nawab of Gandikota while he was in India
Gandikota Fort Canyon - A Complete guide with Pictures!/

Villages in Kadapa district
Archaeological sites in Andhra Pradesh
Canyons and gorges of India
Tourist attractions in Kadapa district
1123 establishments in Asia
Populated places established in the 12th century
12th-century establishments in India